"Queen Versus Bent" is an episode of the Australian television series Consider Your Verdict. It is notable for featuring Aboriginal actor Harold Blair.

Plot
Tommy Bent, an Aboriginal stockman, is charged with shooting the boss's nephew Graham.

Cast
Juliana Allen as Lynne Driscoll
Harold Blair as Tommy Bent
David Watt as Leslie Butler
Vernon Spencer as Graham Butler
James Scullin as Rocky Hawkins
Raymond Fedden as Ed Rowe
Isobel Kuhl as Gladys Willetts
George Fairfax as Crown prosecutor John Taylor
Wynn Roberts as Defence counsel Robert Winter

References

External links
Queen Versus Bent at IMDb

1960s Australian television plays
1962 television plays